The following are results from the automobile and motorcycle races contested at the Circuit de la Sarthe and Bugatti circuits in Le Mans, France.

Automobile Races

Formula One World Championship

The 1967 French Grand Prix was the only time the Bugatti Circuit had been used for Formula 1.

French Grand Prix
The 1906 Grand Prix de l'Automobile Club de France, commonly known as the 1906 French Grand Prix, was a motor race held on closed public roads outside Le Mans. Lasting for more than 12 hours overall, the race was won by Ferenc Szisz. It was the first genuinely international race to carry the label "Grand Prix" and is commonly known as "the first Grand Prix".

Grand Prix de France

24 Hours of Le Mans races

The 24 Hours of Le Mans is the world's oldest active sports car race in endurance racing, held annually since  on the Circuit de la Sarthe, France. It is one of the most prestigious automobile races in the world. Since 2012, the 24 Hours of Le Mans has been a part of the FIA World Endurance Championship.

Grand Prix de l'U.M.F. Cyclecar Race

Sarthe Cup

The Sarthe Cup was a race for voiturettes. It was run along with the Grand Prix de France.

Grand Prix for Voiturettes

Grand Prix Bugatti

The Bugatti Grand Prix was an annual race reserved for Bugatti cars. It was created by Ettore Bugatti and was held one week before the 24 hours race on the Circuit de la Sarthe.

Le Mans 3 Hours/ 4 Hours Races

The 3 and 4 Hours Le Mans races were hold during the practice for the 24 hours races.

Le Mans Sprint

2 races x 11 laps were held in conjunction with the preliminary tests for the 1986 24 Hours of le Mans.

European Le Mans Series

The 2003 1000 km of Le Mans was a one-off sports car event run under the organization of the ACO. It was an experimental event to gauge the desire for teams to participate in a European-based endurance sportscar series under Le Mans rules. It was run on the Bugatti Circuit.

International Sports Racing Series

Deutsche Tourenwagen Masters

Formula 3 Euro Series Championship

International Formula 3000 Championship

European Formula 3 Cup

Formula Renault 3.5 Series

Eurocup Formula Renault 2.0

French Formula Renault 2.0

Formula Renault 2.0 Suisse

Trophées de France

The Trophées de France, was a domestic championship which took place in France for Formula Two cars between 1964 and 1967.

French Formula 3 Championship

Coupe de Vitesse

Trophée de la Sarthe
The Trophée de la Sarthe was a Formula Two race held in support of the 1967 French Grand Prix.

French Formula 4 Championship

Grand Prix Explorer
The GP Explorer or Grand Prix Explorer is a Formula 4 car competition bringing together 22 Internet personalities organized by the french YouTuber Squeezie.

French Formula Ford

FFSA GT Championship

French Supertouring Championship

* The 2001 event was run with the  Belgian Procar Championship

NASCAR Whelen Euro Series

The NASCAR Whelen Euro Series (formerly known as Euro-Racecar NASCAR Touring Series) is an official NASCAR stock-car racing series based in Europe.

Porsche Carrera Cup France

Porsche Carrera Cup Le Mans
 
The Porsche Carrera Cup Le Mans race is a support race to the 24 Hours of Le Mans with the participation of drivers from Porsche Carrera Cups from all over the world. In 2014 and 2017, the Porsche Carrera Cup Great Britain joined the Porsche Carrera Cup France and in 2020, the Porsche Carrera Cup Germany joined the Porsche Carrera Cup France on a single race at the Circuit de la Sarthe. In addition several participants of others Porsche Carrera Cups were allowed to enter these races like Porsche Carrera Cup Benelux, Porsche Carrera Cup Asia...

Porsche Carrera Cup Germany

The Porsche Carrera Cup Germany held a race at the Circuit Bugatti in 2000 as support to the French Supertouring Championship and in 2006 as support to the DTM.

Porsche Sprint Challenge France

Peugeot 905 Spider Cup
The first and last races were held on the Circuit de la Sarthe track as support to the 24 Hours of Le Mans. The second 1992 race was held on the Bugatti Circuit.

SuperSport Trophy
The 1994 and 1996 races were held on the Circuit de la Sarthe track as support to the 24 Hours of Le Mans.

Ferrari Challenge Europe

The Ferrari Challenge Europe held races as support to the 24 Hours of Le Mans n the Circuit de la Sarthe.

Aston Martin Le Mans Festival

The Aston Martin Le Mans Festival held races as support to the 24 Hours of Le Mans on the Circuit de la Sarthe. It  features GTE, GT1, GT2, GT3, GT4 Aston Martin cars.

Ligier European Series

Formula Le Mans Cup
The 2009 Formula Le Mans Cup season was the only season of the Formula Le Mans Cup, a support series for the Le Mans Series and the 24 Hours of Le Mans.

Michelin Le Mans Cup
The series featured LMP3 and GT3 category cars competing in their respective class.

Eurocup Mégane Trophy
The Renault Eurocup Mégane Trophy was a one-make racing series created and managed by Renault Sport. The Renault Eurocup has run with various models under differing names since 1976.

French Renault Cup

Renault Sport Trophy

Peugeot Racing Cup

V de V Series

Challenge Monoplace
The V de V Challenge Monoplace is a championship for open wheel racing cars.

Challenge Endurance Proto
The V de V Challenge Endurance Proto is an endurance championship for prototype sports racing cars.

Challenge GT Tourisme LMP3
The V de V Challenge Endurance  GT Tourisme LMP3 is an endurance championship for GT sport cars and touring cars.

Ultimate Cup Series

Challenge Monoplace

Challenge Proto

GT-Touring Endurance

GT-Touring Sprint

Motorcycle Races

French motorcycle Grand Prix

Moto E

Most wins

Superbike World Championship

European Supersport Championship

French Superbike Championship

FIM Sidecar World Championship

Bol d'Or

24 Hours of Le Mans Moto

The 24 Hours of Le Mans Moto is a motorcycle endurance race held annually since 1978 on the Bugatti Circuit.

1000 km of Le Mans

The 1000 km of Le Mans was a motorcycle endurance race held annually on the Bugatti Circuit before the creation of the 24 Heures Moto.

ACO Criterium

The ACO Criterium consisted of two races of 10 laps on the Circuit de la Sarthe. A Criterium winner was declared with a final standing resulting on the results of both races. It was the first time since the 1929 French Grand Prix that motorcycle raced on the full Circuit de la Sarthe. The 1970 races marked the last time motorcycle raced on the full Circuit de la Sarthe.

FIM CEV Moto3 International Championship

Northern Talent Cup

Red Bull MotoGP Rookies Cup

The Red Bull MotoGP Rookies Cup is a 250cc class of KTM motorcycle, ridden by up and coming motorcycle riders that have not had experience in a Motorcycle Grand Prix previously.

FIM e-Power International Championship

eRoad Racing World Cup

The 2013 FIM eRoad Racing World Cup season was the only season of the eRoad Racing championship for electric motorcycle road racing.

References

Motorsport venues in France
Race results at motorsport venues